From Zero was a nu metal band from Chicago, Illinois.

History
Formed in 1998, From Zero's music is distinguished from many earlier nu metal groups with its greater focus on vocal harmonies, and correspondingly fewer elements of hip-hop than groups such as Limp Bizkit.

In 1999, the band independently released their self-titled EP (referred to as "The Green Album"). At this time, they were also opening for bands such as Amen, Disturbed, Nickelback and Nothingface.

They later signed with Arista Records, where they released two major label albums in One Nation Under (which features many re-recorded songs from their self-titled album) (2001) and My So-Called Life (2003). They released two music videos for the songs "Check Ya" and "Smack". Before the recording of My So-Called Life, bassist Rob Ruccia left the band to do production work on other bands, leaving vocalist Jett to record the bass for the album. They later recruited Avi Kopernik to play bass for the group's live shows.

After being dropped by Arista less than a month after the release of My So-Called Life, they went to work preparing for their third album. As time went on, writing music became a chore and Jett with nothing to fall back on, needed to concentrate on a day job to support his family. Joe Pettinato, who already had a construction business, then left the band, and the rest of the group called it quits. Two songs from the intended album, "Middle of the Road" and "My Own Destiny", can still be streamed on their official PureVolume page.

The band was promoted by the Real World: Back to New York residents while the cast were working for Arista.

In 2021 former member Rob Ruccia along with members of Nonpoint launched an independent record label called 361 Degrees Records.

Members

Final members
 Paulie Gervasio Weiner "Jett" - lead vocals, keyboards, bass guitar (1999–2005)
 Peter Capizzi - rhythm guitar, backing vocals (1998–2005)
 Joe Pettinato "BOD" - lead guitar (1998–2005)
 Avi Kopernik - bass guitar (2002–2005)
 Johnny Dinu "Kid" - drums (1998–2005)

Former members
 Rob Ruccia "Likey" - bass guitar, backing vocals (1998–2002)
 Sonny DeLuca - lead vocals (1998–1999)

Discography

Albums

Singles
 "Check Ya" (2001) No. 37 on Mainstream Rock Tracks
 "Smack" (2001)
 "Sorry" (2003)
 "Fleeting Glimpse" (2003)

References

American nu metal musical groups
American alternative metal musical groups
American hard rock musical groups
Musical groups from Chicago
Heavy metal musical groups from Illinois
Musical groups established in 1998
Musical groups disestablished in 2005